More Scared: The House of Faith Years is a compilation album by Californian punk rock band Swingin' Utters, released in 1996. The album chronicles some of the band's material from before they signed to Fat Wreck Chords - it was released because these songs were difficult to obtain otherwise.

Track listing
"Strongman" (Koski) – 2:16
"Reggae Gets Big in a Small Town" (Bonnel) – 1:57
"Smoke like a Girl" (Koski) – 2:35
"Lazer Attack" (Wickersham) – 2:16
"Politician" (McEntee, Koski) – 3:02
"Nine to Five" (McEntee, Koski, Dison) – 1:28
"Could You Lie?" (Koski) – 2:15
"Mommy Mommy" (Callis – 2:43 (a cover of "No" by The Rezillos)
"Scared" (Wickersham) – 2:31
"No Eager Men" (Koski) – 2:59
"Petty Wage" (Koski) – 1:54
"Hello Charlatan" (Koski) – 2:47
"Proven Song" (Koski) – 2:53
"These Pretty Pleasures" (Dison) – 2:55
"Mr. Norris" (Koski, Dison) – 3:01
"Here We Are Nowhere" (Cluney) – 0:57 (cover of a song by Stiff Little Fingers)

Track #7 is from the band's first release, the 7-inch Gives You Strength EP. All nine tracks from Scared (10-inch E.P.) are present: here they are tracks #1, #2, #14, #9, #8, #15, #3, #6, and #13. Tracks #10, #11, #16, #12 are from the band's third release, the No Eager Men single .

Tracks #4 and #5 were previously unreleased.

Credits
 Johnny Peebucks (Bonnel) (vocals)
 Greg McEntee (drums)
 Darius Koski (guitar)
 Kevin Wickersham (bass)
 Max Huber (guitar)
 Joel Dison (guitar "on 1st 13 tracks")

External links
 [ More Scared on Allmusic]
 $wingin' Utter$ official discography

Swingin' Utters albums
1996 compilation albums
SideOneDummy Records compilation albums